Spring Creek is an unincorporated community in Henry County, Tennessee, United States.

References

Unincorporated communities in Henry County, Tennessee
Unincorporated communities in Tennessee